The Diocese of Magnesia was an ancient Bishopric of Early Christianity.

The seat of the bishopric was the town of Magnesia on the Maeander  in western Turkey, and Hierocles ranks it among the bishoprics of the province of Asia. Later documents seem to imply that at one time it bore the name of Maeandropolis.

Known bishops of Magnesia
Saint Charalambos
Damas Bishop of Magnesia at the time of Saint Ignatius
Leontius, Bishop of Magnesia, who at the Council of Chalcedon declared that from Timothy to the time of Chalcedon there had been 26 Bishops of Ephesisus
 Macarius, contemporary of St. Chrysostom
 Daphnus fl 431
 Leontius at the Robber-Council (449) 
 Patritius at the synod in Trullo (692)
 Theophilus at Constantinople (879)

References

Former Roman Catholic dioceses in Asia
History of Aydın Province